Automobili Pininfarina GmbH is a luxury electric vehicle (EV) manufacturer headquartered in Munich, Germany, with roots in the Italian car design firm and coachbuilder Pininfarina SpA. The company also has a design facility and office locations in Turin, Italy. Its first car, the Battista hypercar (named after the founder of Pininfarina SpA, Battista Farina), has been produced from 2021. It was introduced at the Pebble Beach Concours d'Elegance 2018, and 150 units are planned for production.

History  
On 14 December 2015, Mahindra Group acquired Pininfarina SpA, granting the Mahindra Group rights to its name. On 27 February 2018, Autocar India reported that Michael Perschke, former director at Audi India, will head a new Mahindra & Mahindra Ltd. EV project. This project was later confirmed to be Automobili Pininfarina when Mahindra & Mahindra Ltd. announced the launch of Automobili Pininfarina at the 2018 Rome ePrix, a Formula E electric car race, on 13 April 2018. It was here that Paolo Pininfarina, Chairman of Pininfarina SpA, revealed that “this project [helped] me and my family to realize my grandfather’s dream of seeing outstanding innovative cars solely branded Pininfarina on the roads.” Chairman and managing director of Mahindra & Mahindra Ltd Anand Mahindra later commented that “Pininfarina is a hell of a story. But it is an unfinished story. Mahindra will help Pininfarina finish that story and dream of having a ‘Pininfarina’ badged car."

Automobili Pininfarina confirmed the joining of Luca Borgogno from Pininfarina SpA as its Design Director on 18 April 2018. At the same time, it was announced that Automobili Pininfarina will produce the first Pininfarina-branded "ultra-low volume zero-emissions luxury hypercar" from 2020.

On 28 September 2018, Automobili Pininfarina introduced Formula E driver Nick Heidfeld as the Development Driver and brand ambassador. It also announced its technical partnership with Croatian electric car startup Rimac Automobili that will be supplying the EV powertrain and battery technology for the Battista.

On 27 November 2018, Automobili Pininfarina announced that it had invested over €20 million in Pininfarina SpA for its service along with its new "PURA" design philosophy which promises a balance between design and engineering.

At the Geneva Motor Show 2019 the Battista Hypercar was presented to the public for the first time. It has been launched globally throughout the same year.

Models

Battista 

Originally announced as PF0, the Battista is the first Pininfarina-branded high-performance luxury electric hypercar. It is powered by a Rimac Automobili T-shaped 120 kWh battery pack and has four non-synchronous motors placed on each wheel. The car is built on a carbon fibre monocoque chassis and carbon fibre body panels to keep the weight low. Only 150 will be made, with a price of just under €2 million according to the manufacturer. The range amounts to 500 km on a single charge and the hypercar can be recharged from 20 to 80% state-of-charge in less than 25 minutes.

See also 
 Mahindra Group
 Sergio Pininfarina
 Battista Farina
 Andrea Pininfarina
Premium electric vehicle manufacturers:
 Tesla, Inc.
 Rivian
 Faraday Future
 Fisker Inc.
 Karma Automotive
 Lucid Motors
 HiPhi
 Nio
 Byton
 Li Auto

References

External links 

 
 

Pininfarina
Coachbuilders of Italy
Engineering companies of Italy
Battery electric vehicle manufacturers
German brands
Electric vehicle manufacturers of Germany
Manufacturing companies based in Munich